Schinia ciliata is a moth of the family Noctuidae. It is found from southern California east to Utah, Arizona, Colorado, New Mexico, western Kansas and Oklahoma, and scattered throughout Texas.

The wingspan is about 22 mm.

The larvae feed on Gutierrezia sarothrae.

External links
Images
Systematics of Schinia chrysellus (Grote) complex: Revised status of Schinia alencis (Harvey) with a description of two new species (Lepidoptera: Noctuidae: Heliothinae)

Schinia
Moths of North America
Moths described in 1900